Grevillea buxifolia, commonly known as grey spider flower, is a species of flowering plant in the family Proteaceae, and is endemic to New South Wales, Australia. It is an erect to spreading shrub with elliptic to egg-shaped leaves, and woolly-hairy clusters of rust-coloured to fawn flowers.

Description

Taxonomy
This species was first formally described in 1794 by James Edward Smith who gave it the name Embothrium boxifolium in his A Specimen of the Botany of New Holland. In 1810, Robert Brown changed the name to Grevillea buxifolia in Transactions of the Linnean Society of London. The specific epithet (buxifolia) means "box-tree-leaved".

The names of two subspecies of G. buxifolia are accepted by the Australian Plant Census:
 Grevillea buxifolia (Sm.)

Distribution and habitat
Grey spider flower grows in woodland or heath in New South Wales, on the South Coast, Central Coast and inland to near Pigeon House Mountain west of Ulladulla. Subspecies ecorniculata is restricted to the area between Putty, Gospers Mountain and Wollombi north-west of Sydney.

References

External links

buxifolia
Plants described in 1794
Proteales of Australia
Flora of New South Wales
Taxa named by James Edward Smith